Several places are named after Conjeevaram Natarajan Annadurai (15 September 1909 – 3 February 1969), popularly called Anna ("elder brother"), or Perarignar Anna (Anna the scholar). He was a former Chief Minister of the South Indian state of Tamil Nadu. He was the first member of a Dravidian party to hold that post and was also the first non-Congress leader to form a majority government in independent India.

However, he died of cancer just two years into office. Several institutions and organisations are named after him. An Indian regional political party founded by former chief minister of Tamil Nadu M. G. Ramachandran (M.G.R.) at Madurai on 17 October 1972 was named after him as All India Anna Dravida Munnetra Kazhagam

Chennai 
 Anna Terminal, Chennai International Airport
 Arignar Anna Alandur Metro
 Anna Nagar, a neighbourhood in Chennai
 Anna Salai, formerly Mount Road
 Anna Flyover
 Anna University
 Arignar Anna Zoological Park
 Anna Centenary Library
 Anna Square
 Anna Arivalayam, headquarters of DMK

Coimbatore
 Anna University of Technology, Coimbatore

Thoothukkudi 
 Perarignar Anna Bus Terminus
 Anna Nagar

Tiruchirappalli
 Anna University BIT-Campus
 Anna Nagar
 Anna Stadium

Tirunelveli
 Anna Stadium

Nagercoil
Anna Town Bus Stand,Nagercoil
Anna Sports Stadium,Nagercoil

Pondicherry

 Anna Nagar
 Anna Thidal

Annadurai
Annadurai
Tamil Nadu-related lists
Memorials to C. N. Annadurai